Discordia is a 2004 feature documentary film directed by Ben Addelman and Samir Mallal.  Produced by the National Film Board of Canada, it chronicles life of three students — Aaron Maté, Noah Sarnah, and Samer Elatrash — during the aftermath of the Netanyahu Incident at Concordia University in Montreal in 2002.

See also
Confrontation at Concordia

External links
 
 
Watch Discordia at the National Film Board of Canada

2004 films
Canadian documentary films
English-language Canadian films
National Film Board of Canada documentaries
Concordia University
Documentary films about Montreal
Films directed by Ben Addelman
Films directed by Samir Mallal
Israeli–Palestinian conflict films
2004 documentary films
2000s English-language films
2000s Canadian films
English-language documentary films